Deer Park is an unincorporated community and census-designated place in Washington County, Alabama, United States. Although a ghost town by 1966 it had a population of 188 at the 2010 census. Deer Park has a post office with ZIP code 36529.

Demographics

Notable people
 Jeff Kelly - former National Football League quarterback and current head football coach for Saraland High School
 Beverly Jo Scott - singer-songwriter, was born in Deer Park in 1959

References

Census-designated places in Washington County, Alabama
Census-designated places in Alabama
Unincorporated communities in Washington County, Alabama
Unincorporated communities in Alabama
Ghost towns in Alabama